The 1991–92 Chicago Blackhawks season saw the Blackhawks finish second in the Norris Division with a record of 36 wins, 29 losses, and 15 ties for 87 points. They defeated the St. Louis Blues in six games in the Division Semi-finals and swept the first-place Detroit Red Wings in the Division Finals. After sweeping the Edmonton Oilers in the Campbell Conference Finals, the Blackhawks met the defending Stanley Cup champion Pittsburgh Penguins in the Stanley Cup Finals. However, Chicago's luck ran out against Pittsburgh, as the Penguins swept them in four straight games to capture their second straight Stanley Cup championship.

Offseason

Following the Blackhawks implosion in the first round of the 1991 playoffs, it was no surprise Mike Keenan made some major changes.  The offseason saw the Hawks make a series of trades that parted ways with Doug Wilson, Troy Murray, Dave Manson, Wayne Presley, Adam Creighton, Steve Thomas, and Greg Millen.  In return the Hawks added Brent Sutter, Steve Smith, Bryan Marchment, and Brad Lauer.

NHL Draft

Regular season

Following their President's Cup level play the prior year, the 1991-92 regular season was disappointing second-place finish with only 87 points (19 less than the prior year).  The Blackhawks did, however, make the playoffs for their 23 consecutive season. The Blackhawks had the most power-play opportunities in the NHL, with 467.

Offensively, the Hawks were led by center Jeremy Roenick in goals (53), assists (50) and scoring (103).  This was Roenick's first of three straight 100 point seasons.  Steve Larmer was second on the team in goals (29) and points (74).  Chris Chelios was second on the team in assists (47) and tied with Steve Smith for the lead in goals (9) by a defenseman.  Mike Peluso only played in 63 games, but was able to accumulate 408 minutes in the penalty box breaking Dave Manson's record.

Ed Belfour's multiple trophy season the year before virtually continued into the 1991–92 season despite being a contract holdout to begin the season.  He also missed a brief spell in the second half of the season due to personal reasons.  This enabled Dominik Hasek to show flashes of the brilliance that would later define his Hall of Fame career.  Hasek earned All-Rookie honors with a 10-4-1 record and a 2.60 GGA, while Belfour was 21-18-10 with a 2.70 GGA.  The Hawks tried to get former first-rounder Jimmy Waite going during Belfour's holdout absence, however he could only produce a 4-7-4 record and a 3.69 GGA. Raymond LeBlanc, the ex-Team USA goalie, played one game in net, allowing only 1 goal in a win versus the San Jose Sharks.

Final standings

Schedule and results

Player statistics

Skaters

Note: GP = Games played; G = Goals; A = Assists; Pts = Points; +/- = Plus/minus; PIM = Penalty minutes

Goaltenders
Note: GP = Games played; TOI = Time on ice (minutes); W = Wins; L = Losses; OT = Overtime losses; GA = Goals against; SO = Shutouts; SV% = Save percentage; GAA = Goals against average

Playoffs

The Blackhawks began the playoffs against their rival the St. Louis Blues.  After splitting the first two in Chicago, the Hawks would go on the road and lose a thriller in double-OT to find themselves down 1–2.  The Blackhawks would win the last three games to close out the Blues in six games, and started a playoff winning streak

Apr 18, 1992 - CHI 3-STL 1 	

Apr 20, 1992 - CHI 3-STL 5 	

Apr 22, 1992 - STL 5-CHI 4 (OT) 	

Apr 24, 1992 - STL 3-CHI 5 	

Apr 26, 1992 - CHI 6-STL 4 	

Apr 28, 1992 - STL 1-CHI 2

The Blackhawks then took on the Detroit Red Wings, and kept the winning streak going by sweeping the Red Wings to advance to the Campbell Conference Finals

May 2, 1992 - DET 1-CHI 2 	

May 4, 1992 - DET 1-CHI 3 	

May 6, 1992 - CHI 5-DET 4 	

May 8, 1992 - CHI 1-DET 0

Conference finals

In the Conference Final, the Blackhawks faced the Edmonton Oilers for the fourth time in ten years. The Oilers had won all three previous matchups in 1983, 1985, and 1990. But this time around, with many of the players from the Oilers dynasty long gone, the Blackhawks kept their playoff winning streak going sweeping Edmonton in four games.  The Blackhawks totally dominated the Oilers, outscoring them 21–8.  The streak now reached 11 games (all with Belfour in net setting a Hawks playoff record for consecutive playoff wins by a goalie).  The Hawks would be in the Stanley Cup Finals for the first time since 1973.

Stanley Cup finals

The Blackhawks were facing Mario Lemieux and the defending champion Pittsburgh Penguins, who also swept their way into the Finals beating the Bruins.  Lemieux proved to be too much for the Hawks, sweeping them en route to his second Conn Smythe Trophy.

Impact on the NBA Finals

The Chicago Bulls were in the NBA Finals in 1992, but were successful as they repeated as NBA champions, defeating the Portland Trail Blazers in six games. This was the only year that both the Bulls and the Blackhawks reached their respective league's finals in the same year.

Awards and records
Clarence S. Campbell Bowl
 Dominik Hasek, NHL All-Rookie Team

All-Star Game
 Ed Belfour, Starter, Clarence Campbell Conference
 Chris Chelios, Starter, Clarence Campbell Conference
 Jeremy Roenick, Reserve, Clarence Campbell Conference

References

Sources
Blackhawks on Hockey Database

Chicago Blackhawks seasons
Chicago
Chicago
Western Conference (NHL) championship seasons
Chic
Chic
Chic